Financial compensation refers to the act of providing a person with money or other things of economic value in exchange for their goods, labor, or to provide for the costs of injuries that they have incurred.

Kinds of financial compensation include:

 Damages, legal term for the financial compensation recoverable by reason of another's breach of duty
 Nationalization compensation, compensation paid in the event of nationalization of property
 Payment
 Remuneration
 Deferred compensation
 Executive compensation
 Royalties
 Salary
 Wage
 Employee benefits
 Workers' compensation, to protect employees who have incurred work-related injuries

See also 
 Income
 Faithless servant

Monetary economics